Costa del Este is a town in the province of Buenos Aires in Argentina, belonging to La Costa Partido. It is a luxury spa and health resort, located on the shores of the Atlantic Ocean. It borders Mar del Tuyú to the north and Aguas Verdes to the south.

Populated places in Buenos Aires Province